Dance to the Drums Again is seventh studio album by American jazz singer Cassandra Wilson, released in 1992 via Columbia label.

Reception
In a review for AllMusic, Scott Yanow noted that with this album, Wilson was at the "crossroads of her career". A reviewer for New York wrote: "This disc benefits greatly from the strength of the material most of which was penned by Wilson and guitarist-co-producer Jean-Paul Bourelly".

Track listing
All songs by Jean-Paul Bourelly and Cassandra Wilson unless otherwise noted.
 "Melanin Song" – 5:33
 "Don't Look Back" – 4:55
 "Rhythm on My Mind" – 5:39
 "Wonders of Your Love" (James Weidman, Wilson) – 4:11
 "Nothin' But a Thang" – 5:57
 "I Will Be There" – 5:54
 "Just Keep Thinking of Eubay" – 6:02
 "Another Rainy Day" (Wilson) – 3:57
 "Amazing Grace" (John Newton) – 4:48
 "Dance to the Drummer Again" (Wilson) – 5:15

Personnel
Cassandra Wilson – vocals, guitar, piano, synthesizer, engineer, mixing
Jean-Paul Bourelly – guitar, baritone guitar, guitar synthesizer, synthesizer, engineer, mixing
Doc Rhythm Boss – percussion
Kevin Bruce Harris – bass, electric guitar
Jeff Haynes – percussion
Kevin Johnson – drums
Mark Johnson – drums
Bill McClellan – drums
James Weidman – synthesizer, piano, drums
Rod William – synthesizer

Production notes
Produced by Cassandra Wilson and Jean-Paul Bourelly
Joseph Marciano – engineer, mixing
Sandy Summers Head – assistant producer
Kazunori Sugiyama – project coordinator
Abigayle Tarsches – cover photo

References

1992 albums
Cassandra Wilson albums
Columbia Records albums